is a classification yard on the Kagoshima Main Line operated by Japan Freight Railway Company in Higashi-ku, Fukuoka, Japan.

 

Railway stations in Fukuoka Prefecture
Stations of Japan Freight Railway Company
Railway stations in Japan opened in 2003